3428 Roberts is a background asteroid from the central regions of the asteroid belt, approximately  in diameter. It was discovered on 1 May 1952, by Indiana University's Indiana Asteroid Program at its Goethe Link Observatory near Brooklyn, Indiana, United States. The asteroid has a short rotation period of 3.28 hours. It was named in memory for American astronomer Walter Orr Roberts.

Orbit and classification 

Roberts is a non-family asteroid of the main belt's background population when applying the hierarchical clustering method to its proper orbital elements. It orbits the Sun in the central asteroid belt at a distance of 2.2–3.1 AU once every 4 years and 4 months (1,587 days; semi-major axis of 2.66 AU). Its orbit has an eccentricity of 0.17 and an inclination of 9° with respect to the ecliptic. The body's observation arc begins with its official discovery observation at Goethe Link in May 1952.

Naming 

This minor planet was named in memory of American physicist and astronomer Walter Orr Roberts (1915–1990), founding director of the National Center for Atmospheric Research, who was one of the first astronomers to use a coronagraph for his solar observations in the 1940s. The official naming citation was published by the Minor Planet Center on 5 September 1990.

Physical characteristics 

Roberts spectral type is unknown. The Collaborative Asteroid Lightcurve Link (CALL) generically assumed it to be either a C-type or S-type asteroid.

Rotation period and poles 

In March 2008, a rotational lightcurve of Roberts was obtained from photometric observations at the Oakley Southern Sky Observatory in Australia. Lightcurve analysis gave a well-defined rotation period of 3.278 hours with a high brightness amplitude of 0.58 magnitude, indicative of an elongated shape. In 2016, a modeled lightcurves using photometric data from various sources, gave a sidereal period of  hours and two spin axes of (63.0°, 49.0°) and (231.0°, 49.0°) in ecliptic coordinates (λ, β).

Diameter and albedo 

According to the surveys carried out by the Japanese Akari satellite and the NEOWISE mission of NASA's Wide-field Infrared Survey Explorer, Roberts measures between 17.16 and 18.47 kilometers in diameter and its surface has an albedo between 0.082 and 0.095.

CALL assumes an albedo of 0.10 – a compromise value between the stony (0.20) and carbonaceous (0.057) asteroids of the inner and outer main belt, respectively – and calculates a diameter of 16.73 kilometers based on an absolute magnitude of 12.0.

References

External links 
 (3428) Roberts, 3D Asteroid Catalogue
 Lightcurve Database Query (LCDB), at www.minorplanet.info
 Dictionary of Minor Planet Names, Google books
 Discovery Circumstances: Numbered Minor Planets (1)-(5000) – Minor Planet Center
 
 

003428
003428
Named minor planets
19520501